"Poppin' Them Thangs" is a song recorded by G-Unit and produced by Dr. Dre and Scott Storch. It was released in November 2003 through Interscope Records and 50 Cent's G-Unit Records as the second single from their debut album, Beg for Mercy. The first verse of the song is rapped by 50 Cent, followed by Lloyd Banks, and the final verse is rapped by Young Buck.

Music video
A music video was shot for the song, in which G-Unit are involved in a meeting with many of the world's various gang leaders. Near the end of the video, G-Unit soldiers, including The Game, arrive to support 50 Cent and convince the gang leaders to back down & give in to G-Unit's demands. Due to Tony Yayo being incarcerated, he was unable to appear in the song, however, he is referenced in the video with G-Unit owning a company called Yayo's Trucking Co.

Charts

References

2003 singles
G-Unit songs
Music videos directed by Director X
Song recordings produced by Dr. Dre
Songs written by 50 Cent
Song recordings produced by Scott Storch
Gangsta rap songs